Intellectual honesty is an applied method of problem solving, characterised by an unbiased, honest attitude, which can be demonstrated in a number of different ways:

 One's personal beliefs or politics do not interfere with the pursuit of truth;
 Relevant facts and information are not purposefully omitted even when such things may contradict one's hypothesis;
 Facts are presented in an unbiased manner, and not twisted to give misleading impressions or to support one view over another;
 References, or earlier work, are acknowledged where possible, and plagiarism is avoided.

Harvard ethicist Louis M. Guenin describes the "kernel" of intellectual honesty to be "a virtuous disposition to eschew deception when given an incentive for deception".

Intentionally committed fallacies in debates and reasoning are called intellectual dishonesty.

See also
 Academic honesty 
 Conflict of interest 
 Epistemic feedback
 Good faith
 Intellectual 
 List of fallacies
 Scientific method 
 Sophism
 Systemic bias

References
Notes

Further reading

External links

Research ethics
Philosophical methodology
Anti-intellectualism